Rafael Henrique Assis Cardoso, known as Rafael Assis (born 31 October 1990) is a Brazilian football player who plays for Portuguese club Varzim.

Club career
He made his professional debut in the Campeonato Carioca for Olaria on 19 January 2013 in a game against Audax Rio.

He made his Primeira Liga debut for Chaves on 4 September 2016, when he played the whole game in a 1–0 victory against Nacional.

References

External links

1990 births
Footballers from Belo Horizonte
Living people
Brazilian footballers
Esporte Clube Bahia players
Duque de Caxias Futebol Clube players
Figueirense FC players
Esporte Clube Tigres do Brasil players
Olaria Atlético Clube players
S.C. Beira-Mar players
Brazilian expatriate footballers
Expatriate footballers in Portugal
Liga Portugal 2 players
Saudi Professional League players
G.D. Chaves players
Primeira Liga players
S.C. Braga players
S.C. Braga B players
F.C. Paços de Ferreira players
Al-Fayha FC players
Varzim S.C. players
Londrina Esporte Clube players
Association football midfielders
Expatriate footballers in Saudi Arabia
Brazilian expatriate sportspeople in Portugal
Brazilian expatriate sportspeople in Saudi Arabia